The 1975 European Cup Winners' Cup Final was a football match contested between Dynamo Kyiv of the Soviet Union and Ferencváros of Hungary. It was the final match of the 1974–75 European Cup Winners' Cup and the 15th European Cup Winners' Cup final. The final was held at St. Jakob Stadium in Basel, Switzerland. Dynamo won the match 3–0 thanks to goals by Vladimir Onishchenko (2) and Oleg Blokhin.

Route to the final

Match details

See also
1975 European Cup Final
1975 UEFA Cup Final
FC Dynamo Kyiv in European football
Ferencvárosi TC in European football

External links
UEFA Cup Winners' Cup results at Rec.Sport.Soccer Statistics Foundation
1975 European Cup Winners' Cup Final at UEFA.com
Match report

3
Cup Winners' Cup Final 1975
Cup Winners' Cup Final 1975
1975
UEFA Cup Winners' Cup Finals
UEFA
UEFA
Sports competitions in Basel
Cup Winners' Cup Final
20th century in Basel